Amay Morajkar (born 20 June 2000) is an Indian professional footballer who plays as a midfielder for Bengaluru in the Indian Super League.

Career

Bengaluru FC
Morajkar joined Bengaluru FC Reserves and Academy from AIFF Academy in 2016. Morajkar won Bangalore Super Division with the reserves team in 2018–19 and 2019–20 seasons. Morajkar also represented Karnataka football team in Santosh Trophy.

Morajkar was announced as a part of 30-member squad for 2020 AFC Cup. Morajkar made his professional debut against Paro F.C. in 62nd minute when he replaced Suresh Singh Wangjam. Bengaluru won the game 9–1.

Career statistics

References

2000 births
Living people
People from Goa
Indian footballers
Bengaluru FC players
Association football midfielders
Footballers from Goa
Indian Super League players
I-League 2nd Division players